The 2008 Istanbul Park GP2 Series round was a GP2 Series motor race held on May 10 and 11, 2008 at Istanbul Park in Istanbul, Turkey. It was the second round of the 2008 GP2 Series season. The race weekend supported the 2008 Turkish Grand Prix.

Classification

Qualifying

Feature race

Sprint race

References

Istanbul Park
GP2
Auto races in Turkey
May 2008 sports events in Turkey